Depot Island is a small island in the Øygarden Group, lying  north of the western end of Shaula Island. It was mapped by Norwegian cartographers from aerial photographs taken by the Lars Christensen Expedition, 1936–37, and so named by the Antarctic Names Committee of Australia because a depot was established there by the Australian National Antarctic Research Expeditions during 1956.

See also 
 List of Antarctic and sub-Antarctic islands

References

Islands of Kemp Land